Rose Kennedy (also commonly known as a "VSS" (vodka soda splash) is a cocktail popular in the mid-Atlantic and Northeastern United States. It consists of varying amounts of vodka and club soda with a splash of cranberry juice for color and taste.

The cocktail, was typically garnished with a lime wedge, and is based on the Cape Cod and named after Rose Kennedy, the matriarch of the Kennedy Family of Cape Cod and the mother of President John F. Kennedy from Massachusetts. It was first called a Rose Kennedy at Trumpets, a long ago gay bar in Washington DC in the early to mid-90s. At the time a "real" Rose Kennedy was garnished with lemon only and contained only enough cranberry to make the drink barely pink making the squeezed lemon and cranberry flavors faint but equal. At the time, the use of a lime made it an Ethel Kennedy.

The cocktail is one of the most commonly ordered libations in many American bars, though usually referred to as a "George's drink", with a whisper of cranberry. Many variations continue with different vodka brands, but it is originally Stolichnya or Smirnoff as the main ingredient.

See also

 List of cocktails

References

Kennedy family
Cocktails with vodka
Cocktails with cranberry juice
Bubbly cocktails
Three-ingredient cocktails